The Finno-Permic (Fenno-Permic) or Finno-Permian (Fenno-Permian) languages, or sometimes just Finnic (Fennic) languages, are a proposed subdivision of the Uralic languages which comprise the Balto-Finnic languages, Sámi languages, Mordvinic languages, Mari language, Permic languages and likely a number of extinct languages. In the traditional taxonomy of the Uralic languages, Finno-Permic is estimated to have split from Finno-Ugric around 3000–2500 BC, and branched into Permic languages and Finno-Volgaic languages around 2000 BC.
Nowadays the validity of the group as a taxonomical entity is being questioned, and the interrelationships of its five branches are debated with little consensus.

The term Finnic languages has often been used to designate all the Finno-Permic languages, with the term Balto-Finnic used to disambiguate the Finnic languages proper. In Finnish and Estonian scholarly usage, Finnic most often refers to the Baltic-Finnic languages alone.

Subclassification
The subclassification of the Finno-Permic languages varies among scholars. During the 20th century, most classifications treated Permic vs Finno-Volgaic as the primary division. In the 21st century, Salminen rejected Finno-Permic and Finno-Volgaic entirely. Other classifications treat the five branches of Finno-Permic as follows.

See also
Proto-Finnic language

References

Further reading

Uralic languages